Bartosz Salamon (born 1 May 1991) is a Polish professional footballer who plays as a centre-back for Polish club Lech Poznań. He was also a member of the Poland UEFA Euro 2016 squad.

Club career

Early career
Salamon came through the academy of Polish side Lech Poznań after starting his footballing career at Concordia Murowana Goślina.

Brescia and loan to Foggia 
Salamon made his Serie B debut on 3 May 2008 just two days after his 17th birthday, coming off the bench in the 77th minute of the win against Modena. On 17 January 2009, he appeared in Brescia's starting eleven for the first time, playing the full 90 minutes of the 4–0 win versus Pisa. On 9 August, he scored his first goal for Brescia in a 1–0 win over Ravenna in Coppa Italia.

In July 2010, it was announced he would play on loan at U.S. Foggia in Lega Pro Prima Divisione, the third tier of Italian football.

He returned to Brescia, in Serie B, for the 2011–12 season. In 2012–13, Brescia decided to play him mainly in central defense.

Milan 
On 31 January 2013, Salamon joined Milan, signing a contract until 2017, for a fee of €3.5 million. He was given the number 14 shirt. However, he struggled to displace internationals Philippe Mexès, Cristián Zapata, Daniele Bonera and Mario Yepes in the pecking order.

Sampdoria 
On 11 July 2013, Salamon was transferred to Sampdoria in a co-ownership deal for €1.6 million, as part of the deal that signing 50% registration rights of Andrea Poli for €3 million. The co-ownership deals were terminated on 9 June 2014, for an additional €4 million (Poli) and €1.6 million (Salamon) respectively. On 1 September 2014 Salamon joined Pescara in a temporary deal.

Cagliari
On 31 August 2015, Salamon was sold to Cagliari in a five-year contract for €1 million.

Hee made his debut on 7 September 2015, in a 4–0 win over Crotone and with time became  a star performener for the club. In the 2015–16 season he won the Serie B title and was thus promoted to Serie A.

He was loaned to newly promoted S.P.A.L. 2013 at the beginning of the 2017-18 season. He made his debut for the club in a 3–2 win against Udinese.

Frosinone
On 9 August 2018, Salamon joined to Serie A side Frosinone on loan until 30 June 2019 with an obligation to buy.

Lech Poznań
On 9 January 2021 he signed a three-and-a-half-year contract with Polish Ekstraklasa side Lech Poznań. He is a product of their youth system and returned to Poznań after nearly fourteen years.

International career 
Salamon has represented Poland at U-16, U-17, U-18, U-19, U-20 and U-21 levels. In September 2010, he received his first call up to the senior Poland national football team, for the matches against the United States and Ecuador. He made his debut on 26 March 2013 in a World Cup qualifying match against San Marino.

In March 2016, after a three-year absence the national team squad, he received a call from Poland Manager Adam Nawałka for matches against Serbia and Finland. On 30 May 2016, he was called up to Poland squad for UEFA Euro 2016, however he was an unused substitute in all the matches

Career statistics

Club

International

Honours
Cagliari
Serie B: 2015–16

Lech Poznań
Ekstraklasa: 2021–22

Individual
Ekstraklasa Defender of the Season: 2021–22

References

External links 
 
 
 Bartosz Salamon profile at acmilan.com
 Bartosz Salamon Italian league stats at aic.football.it 
 Bartosz Salamon international caps at uefa.com
 Lega Serie A profile 

1991 births
Living people
Footballers from Poznań
Association football defenders
Polish footballers
Poland youth international footballers
Poland under-21 international footballers
Poland international footballers
UEFA Euro 2016 players
Brescia Calcio players
Calcio Foggia 1920 players
Lech Poznań players
A.C. Milan players
U.C. Sampdoria players
Cagliari Calcio players
S.P.A.L. players
Frosinone Calcio players
Serie A players
Serie B players
Ekstraklasa players
Polish expatriate footballers
Expatriate footballers in Italy
Polish expatriate sportspeople in Italy